Carlos Delgado (born 5 October 1970) is a Nicaraguan taekwondo practitioner. He competed in the men's +80 kg event at the 2000 Summer Olympics.

References

1970 births
Living people
Nicaraguan male taekwondo practitioners
Olympic taekwondo practitioners of Nicaragua
Taekwondo practitioners at the 2000 Summer Olympics
Place of birth missing (living people)